"Arlekino" (English: Harlequin) is a song by Russian Soviet singer Alla Pugacheva. The song was co-authored by Bulgarian composer Emil Dimitrov and Russian poet Boris Barkas. In 1975, the song was recorded in the studio and released on the singer's first solo extended play Arlekino. It simultaneously became a staple at live performances. For this song, Alla Pugacheva was awarded the Grand Prix of the 1975 Golden Orpheus international song contest in Bulgaria.

Arlekino EP 
This EP was released on 21 June 1975 in the Soviet Union. It was her first solo EP (with studio recordings); before this, she appeared only on compilations. Alongside the lead single "Arlekino", there were two B-sides: "Posidim, pookayem" and "Ty snishsya mne". Although all songs saw popularity in the USSR, they were released only on her second studio album Arlekino i drugiye in 1979.

Track listing

Single "Arlekino" (Bulgaria) 
After Pugacheva's win in the 1975 Golden Orpheus international song contest, Balkanton released a series of live recordings from the contest. All songs in Russian.

Track listing

Single "Harlekino" (GDR) 

This single was recorded by Pugacheva during her tour in the GDR in April 1976 and released in Germany (GDR) by Amiga in 1976. According to the official discography of the singer, it is her third single. The recording of the song "Harlekino" in German was due to the song's high popularity in East Germany.

In addition to being released as a single, the German version of the song "Harlekino" was released on two compilations "Amiga Box 3-76" and "Die grossen Erfolge '76".

Track listing

References

Bibliography 
 

1975 songs
Alla Pugacheva songs
1975 singles
1976 singles
Russian-language songs
Soviet songs